Brookville High School may refer to:

 Brookville High School (Ohio)
 Brookville High School (Virginia), Campbell County, Virginia
 Brookville Area Jr./Sr. High School, Jefferson County, Pennsylvania